Nasaan Ka Man is a Filipino romantic drama horror-thriller film directed by Cholo Laurel and written by Ricky Lee and Rafael Hidalgo. It boasts performances by the country’s young leading dramatic actors Claudine Barretto, Jericho Rosales and Diether Ocampo with Hilda Koronel and Gloria Diaz. Noted commercial director Cholo Laurel, in his first directorial debut in cinema, served as the director of the film.

Set in the mystical and fog-covered outskirts of Baguio, Nasaan Ka Man is a love story about a family shrouded in secrets. As the secrets are revealed, the family learns to let go of their hatred and forgive each other. The film tackles incestuous relationships, necrophilia, and other unpleasant themes that the film studio dared not to go off too far.

Diether Ocampo and Claudine Barretto were from Ikaw ang Lahat sa Akin except Jericho Rosales, which is the former boyfriend of Kristine Hermosa next to Ocampo.

In March 2017, ABS-CBN Film Restoration Project released a digitally restored and memastered version of the film in iTunes in over 43 countries. The restoration of the film was made possible with the help of Central Digital Lab.

Plot
The plot centers on a trio of adopted children, Pilar, Ito, and Joven (Claudine Barretto, Diether Ocampo and Jericho Rosales, respectively) and the spinster sisters, Lilia (Gloria Diaz) and Trining (Hilda Koronel) who raised them. Despite the family's veneer of happiness, closer inspection reveals a clan that's cloaked in secrets.

Pilar and Joven are having a secret romantic relationship. Joven proposed to Pilar which was found out by Ito. During the New Year's Eve celebration, Pilar and Joven asked the blessing of their adoptive mother, Lilia, and her younger sister, Trining. Surprised, Lilia heavily opposed the couple to be wed for it is incestuous despite not being blood-related and hiding their relationship to her. Trining, on the other hand, supported the couple.

Later that night, Trining reminded Lilia about the latter's relationship with Nardo (Jhong Hilario) and how their father opposed the marriage. Lilia and Nardo tried to elope but they were chased by the police. The ensuing pursuit killed Nardo, after being shot by the police, this resulted to the sisters leaving their father.

On the next day, Lilia, realizing the similarities between her past and the couple, gave her blessing infuriating Ito. Lilia confronted Ito revealing that he has obsessive feelings for Pilar. Sometime after Ito kills a cat for no reason, and rapes their maid's daughter Lydia. Later, Joven, Pilar, Lilia, and Trining left the house for a local festival leaving Ito alone. While in the festival, Pilar became ill and driven home by Joven. Joven, about to pick up the sisters, left Pilar at home to rest. Ito realized he is alone with Pilar and took the chance to rape her. Joven, Lilia, and Trining arrived home and saw Ito flustered and running away. Joven followed Ito and the sisters go inside and found Pilar in a miserable state.

When Joven found out about what happened to Pilar, he confronted Ito in a nearby cliff. The two brothers fight until Ito was about to fall to the cliff only to be saved by Joven. Pilar arrived at the scene and Joven, caught off guard by Ito, was pushed to the cliff. Angry at what Ito did, Pilar pushed Ito to the cliff as well. The sisters, however, are not aware of the fate of the boys and searched for them. Later that night, Lilia warned all her connections to tell her in case one of the boys knocked on their doors. While praying, Pilar saw Ito's figure scaring her and comforted by an unscathed Joven, that emerged from the door, and the sisters thought that Pilar is hallucinating.

The doctor told that the hallucinations is caused by the trauma and Pilar is pregnant, resulted from Ito's sexual assault on her. Fearing that Ito might come back, Pilar decided to elope with Joven. In the bus station, Joven was told by an old man (Dante Rivero) sitting next to him that he knows Lilia and Trining. The old man told Joven to return home and find a pile of hospital bills in the basement of their home. Pilar, while buying snacks before boarding, saw figures of Ito and became too scared to move. Joven asked Pilar to go home and look for the bills the old man is talking about.

It was revealed that the old man was Lilia and Trining's father, Don Augusto, and the bills contain a letter for the sisters. It was also revealed that he is not opposing Lilia and Nardo's relationship but Augusto found out that Trining was raped by Nardo. Augusto never intended to kill Nardo; the police was to shoot Nardo to cripple him and pay for his crime. When Trining gave birth, Augusto decided to give the baby to an orphanage to cleanse the child from the sins of Nardo and that baby was revealed to be Pilar.

Ito revealed himself to Pilar, Trining, and Lilia showing that he was alive all along. Ito, now mentally unstable with his obsession, tied the women and was about to start a killing frenzy. As Ito was about to rape Pilar again, Lilia was able to untie herself and hit Ito with a shovel knocking him unconscious. Pilar looks for Joven for help. As Pilar and Joven hugged each other, the sister asked who is Pilar talking to. Pilar realized that she was only talking to Joven's spirit. Pilar's love for Joven stops Joven's spirit from passing on and Joven is in denial of his death. It was revealed that Joven is unconscious after his fall from the cliff and Ito, who gained consciousness first, delivered the killing blow by hitting Joven's head with a rock. In denial of his death, he is confronted by Augusto, who reveals to be dead also, to let Pilar go so Joven's spirit can pass on.

When Pilar gave birth, Joven revealed himself to Pilar one last time showing their love for each other wherever they are. After their goodbyes, Joven and Augusto's spirit pass on.

In the final scene, Pilar, still lonely for Joven's death, cries next to Joven's grave, laid next to Lilia and Trining's parents. The sisters cleaned their father's grave as sign of their forgiveness and Ito is detained in a mental institution.

Cast

Main cast
Claudine Barretto as Pilar
Jericho Rosales as Joven
Diether Ocampo as Ito

Supporting cast
Hilda Koronel as Trining
Gloria Diaz as Lilia
Dante Rivero as Don Augusto
Irma Adlawan as Abling
Jhong Hilario as Nardo
Katherine Luna as Lydia
Lovely Rivero as Joven's mother
Chiqui Del Carmen as Don Augusto's wife
Kokoy Palma as Priest
Tony Roma as Doctor
Carmen Valencia as Komadrona
Lito Joyas as Policeman
Joselito Leuterio as Policeman

Guest cast
Joshua Dionisio as Young Ito
Kathryn Bernardo as Young Pilar
Sean Ignacio as Young Joven
Neri Naig as Young Lilia
Rochelle Cabaltica as Young Trining

Release 
The restored version of Nasaan Ka Man was first released on iTunes on March 22, 2017 in 43 countries including the Philippines, United States, and Japan.

It also received its television premiere on ABS-CBN on September 3, 2017 as part of Sunday's Best presentation and theatrical premiere on October 14, 2017 in selected cinemas.

Reception 
The film was rated PG-13 due to language and scenes.

Critical response

The film received widespread critical acclaim since its release. It was graded "B" by the Cinema Evaluation Board upon its release saying "Rated High B: The acting was uniformly top-notched. The script, editing, cinematography and the production design were excellent. Cholo Laurel was able, sensitive, and imaginative."

Butch Francisco, columnist from The Philippine Star said "Nasaan Ka Man' is a finely crafted movie, creative yet realistic" and it has a little similarity to Wuthering Heights, Hush...Hush, Sweet Charlotte, The Sixth Sense, The Others, and Nick Joaquin's A Portrait of the Artist as Filipino due to the roles of Gloria Diaz and Hilda Koronel as the sisters. Gigi Javier-Alfonso of The Daily Tribune stated that "Nasaan Ka Man is tagged as the dramatic, cinematic film of Star Cinema, which committed to a powerhouse cast and a well-written love story-thriller. And these are delivered. The movie is definitely a film to watch."

Awards

2006 GAWAD URIAN 
Best Supporting Actress (Nasaan Ka Man)- Hilda Koronel

2006 GAWAD TANGLAW 
Best Director - Cholo Laurel
Best Supporting Actor - Diether Ocampo

Soundtrack
An accompanying soundtrack for the movie was also released and performed by Filipino singer Christian Bautista.

Track listing
 Nasaan Ka Man
 Nasaan Ka Man (Minus One)
 Nasaan Ka Man (Movie Trailer Edit)
 Nasaan Ka Man (Music Video)

References

Star Cinema films
Philippine romantic drama films
2005 films
Filipino-language films